Richard Paul Brutton Rowe (9 June 1921 – 6 June 1986) was a British music executive and record producer.  He was head of A&R (Singles) at Decca Records from the 1950s to the 1970s, and produced many top-selling records during that period.

He is historically presented in popular music history as the man who did not sign the Beatles. In Brian Epstein's 1964 autobiography, Rowe is quoted as having rejected them with the words: "Guitar groups are on their way out, Mr. Epstein", although he denied ever having said this. He later signed the Rolling Stones after their audition, thanks to an introduction and encouragement from George Harrison.

Life and career
Rowe was born in London.  He joined the A&R department at Decca in 1948, where his responsibilities were both to discover and produce records by new talents.  In 1953, he produced "Broken Wings" by vocal group, the Stargazers, the first locally-produced and non-American record to reach number one on the newly-published British singles chart.    He persuaded jazz singer Lita Roza to record the novelty song "(How Much Is) That Doggie in the Window", another number one hit in the UK, and had further success in the early and mid-1950s with recording artists including David Whitfield, Winifred Atwell, Jimmy Young, and the Beverley Sisters.

In 1959, he left Decca to join Top Rank Records.  There, he discovered singer Craig Douglas, promoted Bert Weedon – the first British performer to use the electric guitar as a lead instrument – and authorised the successful release in Britain of many American singles including those by Chubby Checker, The Ventures, and Freddy Cannon.  He also supported the release of John Leyton's controversial "death disc" "Johnny Remember Me", produced by Joe Meek.

Rowe returned to Decca in 1961, and promoted the career of Billy Fury, co-producing many of the singer's hits including "Halfway to Paradise".  He also found success with the instrumental duo of Jet Harris and Tony Meehan.  After they had been seen in Liverpool by A&R man Mike Smith the previous month, Rowe auditioned the Beatles in London in January 1962, on the same day as auditioning Brian Poole and the Tremeloes.  Rowe and Smith agreed to accept the latter group and reject the Beatles, partly because the Tremeloes were based closer to London and would be easier to work with.  However, the Beatles went on to land a recording contract with EMI/Parlophone and become the biggest selling and most influential band of all time.

Rowe subsequently signed several Liverpool bands and musicians to Decca, including Beryl Marsden and The Big Three. On George Harrison's recommendation, he also signed The Rolling Stones.  In the 1960s, he remained one of the most important producers and record executives in the United Kingdom, and signed Them (featuring Van Morrison), the Moody Blues, the Zombies, John Mayall's Bluesbreakers, Tom Jones, the Small Faces, the Marmalade, the Animals, Cat Stevens, Procol Harum, Kathy Kirby, and Gilbert O Sullivan amongst others. 

Rowe retired in 1975, and died as a result of diabetes in 1986 at the age of 64.

List of productions
As a producer he had several number ones in the singles chart, and his discography includes:
 The Stargazers: "Broken Wings" released Feb 1953 
 Lita Roza: "(How Much Is) That Doggie in the Window?"  Mar 1953 
 Jimmy Young: "Unchained Melody" Apr 1955 
 Jimmy Young: "The Man from Laramie" Sep 1955 
 Dickie Valentine: "Christmas Alphabet"  Nov 1955
 Billy Fury: "Halfway to Paradise" (reached number 2 in 1961 in the UK)
 Billy Fury: "Jealousy" (reached number 2 in 1961)
 Jet Harris and Tony Meehan: "Diamonds" 1963
 Jet Harris and Tony Meehan: "Scarlett O'Hara" (reached number 2 in 1963)
 Jet Harris and Tony Meehan: "Applejack" (reached number 4 in 1963)
 Engelbert Humperdinck: some tracks on Greatest Love Songs
 Them (featuring Van Morrison): "Gloria"
 The Bachelors: "Marta" Jul 1967 (reached number 20)
 Neil Reid: "Mother Of Mine" Dec 1971 (reached number 2)

Legacy
His son, Richard Rowe, a solicitor working at CBS Records/Sony Records and was president of SonyATV music publishing (and made the deal to create a joint partnership with Michael Jackson to publish the Beatles catalogue as Sony/ATV when he ran the publishing division of Sony Music).

References

1921 births
1986 deaths
British record producers
A&R people
Deaths from diabetes
20th-century British businesspeople